The California Golden Bears rugby team is the college rugby team of the University of California, Berkeley. The Golden Bears have won 33 championships since the national collegiate championships for rugby began in 1980. Current head coach and Cal alumnus Jack Clark took over the team in 1984, and has achieved prolonged success, leading the Bears to 28 national titles, including twelve consecutive championships from 1991 to 2002, five more consecutive titles from 2004 to 2008, and back-to-back titles in 2010 to 2011 and 2016 to 2017.

Cal also competes in the Collegiate Rugby Championship (CRC), the highest profile college rugby tournament in the US.  The CRC is held every June at PPL Park in Philadelphia, and is broadcast live on NBC.  Cal reached the finals of the 2010 CRC, losing to Utah in the finals in sudden death extra time, and finished third in the 2012 CRC. Since 2013, Cal has won the championship 5 consecutive times.

Cal also competes for the "World Cup," which is awarded to the winner of the annual series between Cal and the University of British Columbia.

Cal Rugby's home is at 6,900-seat Witter Rugby Field, located near California Memorial Stadium in Strawberry Canyon.

History 

Rugby began play at Cal in 1882 and continued until 1886, when it was replaced by American football. During the next decade, American football was becoming an increasingly violent sport - the ball carrier would often be pushed and pulled up the field by his own players in massive formations that often resulted in serious injuries. In 1905, 18 deaths and 159 injuries were reported in various football competitions. That year President Theodore Roosevelt lobbied Ivy League representatives to alter the game in order to eliminate or at least reduce its prevalent injuries. This resulted in numerous rule changes agreed upon by the majority of American schools.

Led by Cal and Stanford, universities of the West Coast took a different path - eliminating America football and changing their game to Rugby union. Other schools that made the switch included Nevada, St. Mary's, Santa Clara, and USC (in 1911). Because the switch to rugby occurred only on the West Coast, the number of teams to play against remained small. This led to schools scheduling games against local clubs and reaching out to rugby powers in Australia, New Zealand, as well as Canada.

Cal and Stanford traditional rivalry game –the Big Game, became a rugby union match. With the winner invited by the British Columbia Rugby Union to a tournament in Vancouver over the Christmas holidays to play for the Cooper Keith Trophy. While, Cal won the Cooper cup in 1910, in total it only won three Big Games during this 9 year period. Due to various causes, including students frustration with the results, the Associated Students of the University of California voted to leave the agreement, and along with other west coast universities, return to American football. From 1906 to 1914, Cal's rugby record was 78 wings, 21 losses and 10 ties. Following the switch back to football, Cal continued to play rugby, but it was officially considered to be a "minor" sport.

Primarily Cal, Stanford, and Santa Clara players composed the two US Olympic rugby teams (1920 & 1924) and claimed fame by winning both Gold medals. Prior to the introduction of Rugby 7s at the 2016 Summer Olympics, 1924 was the last time the Olympic Games staged a rugby competition.

In 1931, rugby returned under alumnus Ed Graff. 1938 began the era of Miles "Doc" Hudson, who guided the Bears for 37 years and an incredible record of 339-84-23. His successor was Ned Anderson, an alumnus and former rugger for the Bears.

In September 2010, the university announced that rugby would be one of five varsity sports cut as a cost-cutting measure, though the team would have continued to represent the university as a "varsity club sport." A large group of rugby supporters organized and disputed the relegation. On February 11, 2011, the administration reversed its decision on rugby and two other sports, and rugby was continued as a varsity sport.

Mark Bingham who played for the Golden Bears in the early 1990s was a passenger on board United Airlines Flight 93 on September 11, 2001.

Cal reached the final of the Varsity Cup, every year of the five year competition winning in 2017, and 2018.

Team performances

National championships 

The following table is a list of each of the national championships since 1980 in which Cal has reached at least the semifinals.

†Indicates year in which Cal won the now defunct Varsity Cup.

Varsity Cup 

The following table is a list of each of the Varsity Cups in which Cal has reached at least the semifinals.

USA Rugby Sevens Collegiate National Championships

Collegiate Rugby Championship (Sevens)

PAC Rugby 7s conference championships

National team players

United States

Major international competitions. 
Following players have played for the Eagles, the United States national rugby team in major international competitions.

Mike MacDonald - 2003, 2007 and 2011 Rugby World Cup; also the most-capped player in Eagles history at retirement.
Louis Stanfill - 2007 and 2011 Rugby World Cup
Chris Biller - 2011 Rugby World Cup
Eric Fry - 2011 Rugby World Cup
Blaine Scully - 2011 Rugby World Cup
Colin Hawley - 2011 Rugby World Cup
Kort Schubert - 2003 Rugby World Cup
Kevin Dalzell - 1999 and 2003 Rugby World Cup
Kirk Khasigian - 1999 and 2003 Rugby World Cup

Of the 30-man squad for the 2011 Rugby World Cup, 7 were Cal alums.

Appearances outside of major international competitions. 

 Andre Bachelet 
 Ray Lehner
 Danny Barrett
 Chris O'Brien 
 Shaun Paga 
 Don James
 Seamus Kelly
 Gary Hein
 Steve Hyatt 
 Rob Lumkong

References

External links

 

 
Rugby clubs established in 1882
G
G